Patricia Benson (born 1941) is an American artist. 

Her work is included in the collections of the Smithsonian American Art Museum, the Brooklyn Museum, the Cincinnati Art Museum and the Fine Arts Museums of San Francisco.

References

Living people
1941 births
Artists from Philadelphia
Artists in the Smithsonian American Art Museum collection